Ab Jaz or Abjaz may refer to:
 Ab Jaz, Izeh
 Abjaz, Lali
 Abjaz, Hati, Lali County